Yehuda Wiener-Gafni (also "Ernst";יהודה וינר; born 7 January 1930) is an Israeli former Olympic basketball player.

Basketball career
Wiener-Gafni was a member of the sports club Maccabi Tel Aviv, located in Tel Aviv, Israel. He was a guard, and was 1.75 meters tall. He competed for Israel at the 1952 Summer Olympics in Helsinki, at the age of 22, in Men's Basketball.  The Israeli team came in tied for 20th, after losing 57-47 to the Philippines, and 54-52 to Greece. Wiener-Gafni was also on the Israel national basketball team in the 1954 FIBA World Basketball Championship for Men, in which Israel came in 8th out of 12 teams.

References

External links
 

Israeli men's basketball players
Olympic basketball players of Israel
Maccabi Tel Aviv B.C. players
Basketball players at the 1952 Summer Olympics
1930 births
Possibly living people
1954 FIBA World Championship players